This is an incomplete list of rebel groups in Ethiopia currently and formerly active in the country.

Ethiopian Civil War (1974–1991)

Post-Cold War (1991–present)

References

Ethiopian Civil War
Rebel groups in Ethiopia
Ethiopia